The 1991 Sudirman Cup was the second tournament of the World Mixed Team Badminton Championships. It was held from April 30 to May 4, 1991 in Copenhagen, Denmark.

Results
Nigeria and Pakistan also entered, but ultimately did not participate.

Group 1

Subgroup A

Subgroup B

Relegation play-off

Semi-finals

Final

Group 2

Group 3

Group 4

Group 5

Group 6

Group 7

Group 8

Final classification

References

Sudirman Cup
Sudirman Cup
Sudirman Cup